Sinocyclocheilus is a genus of freshwater fish in the family Cyprinidae endemic to China, only found in Guangxi, Guizhou and Yunnan. Almost all of its species live in or around caves and most of these have adaptions typical of cavefish such as a lack of scales, lack of pigmentation and reduced eyes (some are completely blind). Several species have an unusual hunchbacked appearance and some of the cave-dwellers have a "horn" on the back (above the forehead), the function of which is unclear. In contrast, the Sinocyclocheilus species that live aboveground, as well as a few found underground, show no clear cavefish adaptions. The individual species have small ranges and populations, leading to the status of most of the evaluated species as threatened. Many species populations in the genus have yet to be evaluated by the IUCN.

The type species is S. tingi. The name is derived from the Latin word sino, meaning "from China", and the Greek word kyklos, meaning "circle", and the Greek word cheilos, meaning "lip".

Species
These are the recognized species in this genus. Several others are now considered synonyms. Some taxonomists place the species Sinocyclocheilus jinxiensis to the monotypic genus Pseudosinocyclocheilus, while others continue its placement here.

 Sinocyclocheilus altishoulderus (W. X. Li & J. H. Lan, 1992)
 Sinocyclocheilus anatirostris R. D. Lin & Z. F. Luo, 1986 (Duck-billed golden-line fish)
 Sinocyclocheilus angularis J. Z. Zheng & J. Wang, 1990 (Golden-line angelfish)
 Sinocyclocheilus angustiporus C. Y. Zheng & J. H. Xie, 1985
 Sinocyclocheilus anophthalmus Y. R. Chen, X. L. Chu, Z. Y. Luo & J. Y. Wu, 1988 (Eye-less golden-line fish)
 Sinocyclocheilus anshuiensis X. Gan, T. J. Wu, M. L. Wei & J. Yang, 2013
 Sinocyclocheilus aquihornes W. X. Li & H. F. Yang, 2007
 Sinocyclocheilus biangularis D. Wang, 1996 
 Sinocyclocheilus bicornutus D. Z. Wang & J. W. Liao, 1997
 Sinocyclocheilus brevibarbatus Y. H. Zhao, J. H. Lan & C. G. Zhang, 2009
 Sinocyclocheilus brevifinus J. Li, X. H. Li & Mayden, 2014
 Sinocyclocheilus brevis J. H. Lan & J. X. Chen, 1992
 Sinocyclocheilus broadihornes W. X. Li & W. N. Mao, 2007
 Sinocyclocheilus cyphotergous (D. Y. Dai, 1988)
 Sinocyclocheilus donglanensis Y. H. Zhao, K. Watanabe & C. G. Zhang, 2006
 Sinocyclocheilus flexuosdorsalis D. G. Zhu & Y. Zhu, 2012
 Sinocyclocheilus furcodorsalis Y. R. Chen, J. X. Yang & J. H. Lan, 1997 (Crossed fork-back golden-line fish)
 Sinocyclocheilus gracilicaudatus Y. H. Zhao & C. G. Zhang, 2014
 Sinocyclocheilus gracilis J. Li & X. H. Li, 2014
 Sinocyclocheilus grahami (Regan, 1904) (Golden-line barbel)
 Sinocyclocheilus guanduensis (Li & Xiao, 2004)
 Sinocyclocheilus guanyangensis Y. Q. Chen, C. L. Peng & E. Zhang, 2016
 Sinocyclocheilus guilinensis C. S. Ji, 1985 
 Sinocyclocheilus guishanensis W. X. Li, 2003
 Sinocyclocheilus hei W. X. Li & H. Xiao, 2004
 Sinocyclocheilus huanglongdongensis Li & Xiao, 2004
 Sinocyclocheilus huaningensis W. X. Li, 1998
 Sinocyclocheilus huanjiangensis T. J. Wu, X. Gan & W. X. Li, 2010
 Sinocyclocheilus hugeibarbus W. X. Li & J. C. Ran, 2003
 Sinocyclocheilus huizeensis C. Cheng, X. F. Pan, X. Y. Chen, J. Y. Li, L. Ma & J. X. Yang, 2015
 Sinocyclocheilus hyalinus Y. R. Chen & J. X. Yang, 1993 (Hyaline fish)
 Sinocyclocheilus jii C. G. Zhang & D. Y. Dai, 1992
 Sinocyclocheilus jinxiensis H. F. Zheng, L. H. Xiu & J. Yang, 2012
 Sinocyclocheilus jiuxuensis W. X. Li & J. H. Lan, 2003
 Sinocyclocheilus lateristriatus W. X. Li, 1992
 Sinocyclocheilus liboensis Li, Chen & Ran, 2004
 Sinocyclocheilus lingyunensis W. X. Li, H. Xiao & Z. F. Luo, 2000
 Sinocyclocheilus longibarbatus D. Z. Wang & Y. Y. Chen, 1989
 Sinocyclocheilus ﻿longicornus Cheng Xu, Tao Luo, Jia-Jun Zhou, Li Wu, Xin-Rui Zhao, Hong-Fu Yang, Ning Xiao, Jiang Zhou, 2023
 Sinocyclocheilus longifinus W. X. Li, 1996
 Sinocyclocheilus luolouensis J. H. Lan, 2013
 Sinocyclocheilus luopingensis W. X. Li & J. N. Tao, 2002
 Sinocyclocheilus macrocephalus W. X. Li, 1985
 Sinocyclocheilus macrolepis D. Z. Wang & Y. Y. Chen, 1989
 Sinocyclocheilus macrophthalmus C. G. Zhang & Y. H. Zhao, 2001
 Sinocyclocheilus macroscalus Shen et al., 2000
 Sinocyclocheilus maculatus W. X. Li, 2000
 Sinocyclocheilus maitianheensis W. X. Li, 1992
 Sinocyclocheilus malacopterus X. L. Chu & G. H. Cui, 1985
 Sinocyclocheilus mashanensis T. J. Wu, Z. P. Liao & W. X. Li, 2010
 Sinocyclocheilus microphthalmus G. L. Li, 1989 (Small-eye golden-line fish)
 Sinocyclocheilus multipunctatus (Pellegrin, 1931)
 Sinocyclocheilus oxycephalus W. X. Li, 1985
 Sinocyclocheilus purpureus W. X. Li, 1985
 Sinocyclocheilus qiubeiensis W. X. Li, 2002
 Sinocyclocheilus qujingensis W. X. Li, W. N. Mao & Z. M. Lu, 2002
 Sinocyclocheilus rhinocerous W. X. Li & J. N. Tao, 1994
 Sinocyclocheilus robustus J. X. Chen & Z. F. Zhao, 1988
 Sinocyclocheilus tianlinensis J. Zhao, C. G. Zhang & A. Y. He, 2004
 Sinocyclocheilus tileihornes W. N. Mao, Z. M. Lu & W. X. Li, 2003
 Sinocyclocheilus tingi P. W. Fang, 1936
 Sinocyclocheilus wui W. X. Li & L. An, 2013
 Sinocyclocheilus wumengshanensis W. X. Li, W. N. Mao & Z. M. Lu, 2003
 Sinocyclocheilus xichouensis X. F. Pan, L. Li, J. X. Yang & X. Y. Chen, 2013
 Sinocyclocheilus xunlensis J. H. Lan, Y. H. Zhao & C. G. Zhang, 2004
 Sinocyclocheilus yangzongensis S. L. Tsu & Y. R. Chen, 1977
 Sinocyclocheilus yaolanensis Zhou, Li & Hou, 2009
 Sinocyclocheilus yimenensis W. X. Li & H. Xiao, 2005
 Sinocyclocheilus yishanensis W. X. Li & J. H. Lan, 1992

References

 
Cyprinid fish of Asia
Freshwater fish of China
Freshwater fish genera
Cave fish